The Major Seminary of Tunis (French: Grand Séminaire de Tunis), previously known as the Major Seminary of Carthage, was a Roman Catholic major seminary and the diocesan seminary for the Archdiocese of Tunis. Established in 1881 by Bishop Charles Lavigerie, the seminary was founded for the education of White Fathers missionaries in Africa. It educated both religious and diocesan priests until its closure in 1964. The seminary building, known as La Marsa, also held an extensive museum containing relics from Tunisia's history.

History 
The seminary was founded in 1881 by Bishop Charles Lavigerie.

In 1882, the White Fathers' scholasticate was added to the seminary.

It closed in 1964 and the building became the National School of Administration.

Campus 
The seminary was located in a building called La Marsa. Construction began in 1879 and the building was completed in 1881.

Museum

Rectors 
Léonce Bridoux became rector in the late 1870s.

Notable alumni 
 Jean-Marie Colibault

References 

1880s establishments in Tunisia
1881 establishments in Africa
1964 disestablishments in Tunisia
Religious buildings and structures in Tunis
Catholic Church in Tunisia
Defunct museums in Tunisia
Educational institutions established in 1881
Educational institutions disestablished in 1964
Former Catholic universities and colleges
Museums in Tunisia
Former Catholic seminaries
Universities and colleges in Tunisia
White Fathers